Estrogen or oestrogen is a category of sex hormone responsible for the development and regulation of the female reproductive system and secondary sex characteristics. There are three major endogenous estrogens that have estrogenic hormonal activity: estrone (E1), estradiol (E2), and estriol (E3). Estradiol, an estrane, is the most potent and prevalent. Another estrogen called estetrol (E4) is produced only during pregnancy.

Estrogens are synthesized in all vertebrates and some insects. Their presence in both vertebrates and insects suggests that estrogenic sex hormones have an ancient evolutionary history. Quantitatively, estrogens circulate at lower levels than androgens in both men and women. While estrogen levels are significantly lower in males than in females, estrogens nevertheless have important physiological roles in males.

Like all steroid hormones, estrogens readily diffuse across the cell membrane. Once inside the cell, they bind to and activate estrogen receptors (ERs) which in turn modulate the expression of many genes. Additionally, estrogens bind to and activate rapid-signaling membrane estrogen receptors (mERs), such as GPER (GPR30).

In addition to their role as natural hormones, estrogens are used as medications, for instance in menopausal hormone therapy, hormonal birth control and feminizing hormone therapy for transgender women and nonbinary people.

Synthetic and natural estrogens have been found in the environment and are referred to as xenoestrogens. Estrogens are among the wide range of endocrine-disrupting compounds (EDCs) and can cause health issues and reproductive disfunction in both wildlife and humans.

Types and examples

The four major naturally occurring estrogens in women are estrone (E1), estradiol (E2), estriol (E3), and estetrol (E4). Estradiol (E2) is the predominant estrogen during reproductive years both in terms of absolute serum levels as well as in terms of estrogenic activity. During menopause, estrone is the predominant circulating estrogen and during pregnancy estriol is the predominant circulating estrogen in terms of serum levels. Given by subcutaneous injection in mice, estradiol is about 10-fold more potent than estrone and about 100-fold more potent than estriol. Thus, estradiol is the most important estrogen in non-pregnant females who are between the menarche and menopause stages of life. However, during pregnancy this role shifts to estriol, and in postmenopausal women estrone becomes the primary form of estrogen in the body. Another type of estrogen called estetrol (E4) is produced only during pregnancy. All of the different forms of estrogen are synthesized from androgens, specifically testosterone and androstenedione, by the enzyme aromatase.

Minor endogenous estrogens, the biosyntheses of which do not involve aromatase, include 27-hydroxycholesterol, dehydroepiandrosterone (DHEA), 7-oxo-DHEA, 7α-hydroxy-DHEA, 16α-hydroxy-DHEA, 7β-hydroxyepiandrosterone, androstenedione (A4), androstenediol (A5), 3α-androstanediol, and 3β-androstanediol. Some estrogen metabolites, such as the catechol estrogens 2-hydroxyestradiol, 2-hydroxyestrone, 4-hydroxyestradiol, and 4-hydroxyestrone, as well as 16α-hydroxyestrone, are also estrogens with varying degrees of activity. The biological importance of these minor estrogens is not entirely clear.

Biological function

The actions of estrogen are mediated by the estrogen receptor (ER), a dimeric nuclear protein that binds to DNA and controls gene expression. Like other steroid hormones, estrogen enters passively into the cell where it binds to and activates the estrogen receptor. The estrogen:ER complex binds to specific DNA sequences called a hormone response element to activate the transcription of target genes (in a study using an estrogen-dependent breast cancer cell line as model, 89 such genes were identified). Since estrogen enters all cells, its actions are dependent on the presence of the ER in the cell. The ER is expressed in specific tissues including the ovary, uterus and breast. The metabolic effects of estrogen in postmenopausal women have been linked to the genetic polymorphism of the ER.

While estrogens are present in both men and women, they are usually present at significantly higher levels in women of reproductive age. They promote the development of female secondary sexual characteristics, such as breasts, and are also involved in the thickening of the endometrium and other aspects of regulating the menstrual cycle. In males, estrogen regulates certain functions of the reproductive system important to the maturation of sperm and may be necessary for a healthy libido.

Overview of actions

 Structural
 Anabolic: Increases muscle mass and strength, speed of muscle regeneration, and bone density, increased sensitivity to exercise, protection against muscle damage, stronger collagen synthesis, increases the collagen content of connective tissues, tendons, and ligaments, but also decreases stiffness of tendons and ligaments (especially during menstruation). Decreased stiffness of tendons gives women much lower predisposition to muscle strains but soft ligaments are much more prone to injuries (ACL tears are 2-8x more common among women than men).
 Anti-inflammatory properties
 Mediate formation of female secondary sex characteristics
 Accelerate metabolism
 Increased fat storage in some body parts such as breasts, buttocks, and legs but decreased abdominal and visceral fat (androgenic obesity).Estradiol also regulates energy expenditure, body weight homeostasis, and seems to have much stronger anti-obesity effects than testosterone in general.
 Women tend to have lower base strength but on average have about the same increases of muscle mass in responses to resistance training as men and far faster relative increases in strength.
 Stimulate endometrial growth
 Increase uterine growth
 Increase vaginal lubrication
 Thicken the vaginal wall
 Maintenance of vessel and skin
 Reduce bone resorption, increase bone formation
 Protein synthesis
 Increase hepatic production of binding proteins
 Coagulation
 Increase circulating level of factors 2, 7, 9, 10, plasminogen
 Decrease antithrombin III
 Increase platelet adhesiveness
 Increase vWF (estrogen -> Angiotensin II -> Vasopressin)
 Increase PAI-1 and PAI-2 also through Angiotensin II
 Lipid
 Increase HDL, triglyceride
 Decrease LDL, fat deposition
 Fluid balance
 Salt (sodium) and water retention
 Increase cortisol, SHBG
 Gastrointestinal tract
 Reduce bowel motility
 Increase cholesterol in bile
 Melanin
 Increase pheomelanin, reduce eumelanin
 Cancer
 Support hormone-sensitive breast cancers (see section below)
 Lung function
 Promotes lung function by supporting alveoli (in rodents but probably in humans).
 Uterus lining
 Estrogen together with progesterone promotes and maintains the uterus lining in preparation for implantation of fertilized egg and maintenance of uterus function during gestation period, also upregulates oxytocin receptor in myometrium
 Ovulation
 Surge in estrogen level induces the release of luteinizing hormone, which then triggers ovulation by releasing the egg from the Graafian follicle in the ovary.
 Sexual behavior
 Estrogen is required for female mammals to engage in lordosis behavior during estrus (when animals are "in heat"). This behavior is required for sexual receptivity in these mammals and is regulated by the ventromedial nucleus of the hypothalamus.
 Sex drive is dependent on androgen levels only in the presence of estrogen, but without estrogen, free testosterone level actually decreases sexual desire (instead of increases sex drive), as demonstrated for those women who have hypoactive sexual desire disorder, and the sexual desire in these women can be restored by administration of estrogen (using oral contraceptive).

Female pubertal development
Estrogens are responsible for the development of female secondary sexual characteristics during puberty, including breast development, widening of the hips, and female fat distribution. Conversely, androgens are responsible for pubic and body hair growth, as well as acne and axillary odor.

Breast development

Estrogen, in conjunction with growth hormone (GH) and its secretory product insulin-like growth factor 1 (IGF-1), is critical in mediating breast development during puberty, as well as breast maturation during pregnancy in preparation of lactation and breastfeeding. Estrogen is primarily and directly responsible for inducing the ductal component of breast development, as well as for causing fat deposition and connective tissue growth. It is also indirectly involved in the lobuloalveolar component, by increasing progesterone receptor expression in the breasts and by inducing the secretion of prolactin. Allowed for by estrogen, progesterone and prolactin work together to complete lobuloalveolar development during pregnancy.

Androgens such as testosterone powerfully oppose estrogen action in the breasts, such as by reducing estrogen receptor expression in them.

Female reproductive system
Estrogens are responsible for maturation and maintenance of the vagina and uterus, and are also involved in ovarian function, such as maturation of ovarian follicles. In addition, estrogens play an important role in regulation of gonadotropin secretion. For these reasons, estrogens are required for female fertility.

Neuroprotection and DNA repair

Estrogen regulated DNA repair mechanisms in the brain have neuroprotective effects.  Estrogen regulates the transcription of DNA base excision repair genes as well as the translocation of the base excision repair enzymes between different subcellular compartments.

Brain and behavior

Sex drive

Estrogens are involved in libido (sex drive) in both women and men.

Cognition
Verbal memory scores are frequently used as one measure of higher level cognition. These scores vary in direct proportion to estrogen levels throughout the menstrual cycle, pregnancy, and menopause. Furthermore, estrogens when administered shortly after natural or surgical menopause prevents decreases in verbal memory. In contrast, estrogens have little effect on verbal memory if first administered years after menopause. Estrogens also have positive influences on other measures of cognitive function. However the effect of estrogens on cognition is not uniformly favorable and is dependent on the timing of the dose and the type of cognitive skill being measured.

The protective effects of estrogens on cognition may be mediated by estrogen's anti-inflammatory effects in the brain. Studies have also shown that the Met allele gene and level of estrogen mediates the efficiency of prefrontal cortex dependent working memory tasks. Researchers have urged for further research to illuminate the role of estrogen and its potential for improvement on cognitive function.

Mental health
Estrogen is considered to play a significant role in women's mental health. Sudden estrogen withdrawal, fluctuating estrogen, and periods of sustained low estrogen levels correlate with a significant lowering of mood. Clinical recovery from postpartum, perimenopause, and postmenopause depression has been shown to be effective after levels of estrogen were stabilized and/or restored. Menstrual exacerbation (including menstrual psychosis) is typically triggered by low estrogen levels, and is often mistaken for premenstrual dysphoric disorder.

Compulsions in male lab mice, such as those in obsessive-compulsive disorder (OCD), may be caused by low estrogen levels. When estrogen levels were raised through the increased activity of the enzyme aromatase in male lab mice, OCD rituals were dramatically decreased. Hypothalamic protein levels in the gene COMT are enhanced by increasing estrogen levels which are believed to return mice that displayed OCD rituals to normal activity. Aromatase deficiency is ultimately suspected which is involved in the synthesis of estrogen in humans and has therapeutic implications in humans having obsessive-compulsive disorder.

Local application of estrogen in the rat hippocampus has been shown to inhibit the re-uptake of serotonin. Contrarily, local application of estrogen has been shown to block the ability of fluvoxamine to slow serotonin clearance, suggesting that the same pathways which are involved in SSRI efficacy may also be affected by components of local estrogen signaling pathways.

Parenthood
Studies have also found that fathers had lower levels of cortisol and testosterone but higher levels of estrogen (estradiol) than did non-fathers.

Binge eating
Estrogen may play a role in suppressing binge eating. Hormone replacement therapy using estrogen may be a possible treatment for binge eating behaviors in females. Estrogen replacement has been shown to suppress binge eating behaviors in female mice. The mechanism by which estrogen replacement inhibits binge-like eating involves the replacement of serotonin (5-HT) neurons. Women exhibiting binge eating behaviors are found to have increased brain uptake of neuron 5-HT, and therefore less of the neurotransmitter serotonin in the cerebrospinal fluid. Estrogen works to activate 5-HT neurons, leading to suppression of binge like eating behaviors.

It is also suggested that there is an interaction between hormone levels and eating at different points in the female menstrual cycle. Research has predicted increased emotional eating during hormonal flux, which is characterized by high progesterone and estradiol levels that occur during the mid-luteal phase. It is hypothesized that these changes occur due to brain changes across the menstrual cycle that are likely a genomic effect of hormones. These effects produce menstrual cycle changes, which result in hormone release leading to behavioral changes, notably binge and emotional eating. These occur especially prominently among women who are genetically vulnerable to binge eating phenotypes.

Binge eating is associated with decreased estradiol and increased progesterone. Klump et al. Progesterone may moderate the effects of low estradiol (such as during dysregulated eating behavior), but that this may only be true in women who have had clinically diagnosed binge episodes (BEs). Dysregulated eating is more strongly associated with such ovarian hormones in women with BEs than in women without BEs.

The implantation of 17β-estradiol pellets in ovariectomized mice significantly reduced binge eating behaviors and injections of GLP-1 in ovariectomized mice decreased binge-eating behaviors.

The associations between binge eating, menstrual-cycle phase and ovarian hormones correlated.

Masculinization in rodents
In rodents, estrogens (which are locally aromatized from androgens in the brain) play an important role in psychosexual differentiation, for example, by masculinizing territorial behavior; the same is not true in humans. In humans, the masculinizing effects of prenatal androgens on behavior (and other tissues, with the possible exception of effects on bone) appear to act exclusively through the androgen receptor. Consequently, the utility of rodent models for studying human psychosexual differentiation has been questioned.

Skeletal system
Estrogens are responsible for both the pubertal growth spurt, which causes an acceleration in linear growth, and epiphyseal closure, which limits height and limb length, in both females and males. In addition, estrogens are responsible for bone maturation and maintenance of bone mineral density throughout life. Due to hypoestrogenism, the risk of osteoporosis increases during menopause.

Cardiovascular system
Women are less impacted by heart disease due to vasculo-protective action of estrogen which helps in preventing atherosclerosis. It also helps in maintaining the delicate balance between fighting infections and protecting arteries from damage thus lowering the risk of cardiovascular disease. During pregnancy, high levels of estrogens increase coagulation and the risk of venous thromboembolism. Estrogen has been shown to upregulate the peptide hormone adropin.

Immune system
The effect of estrogen one the immune system is in general described as Th2 favoring, rather than suppressive, as is the case of the effect of male sex hormone - testosterone. Indeed women respond better to vaccines, infections and are generally less likely to develop cancer, the tradeoff of this is that they are more likely do develop an autoimmune disease. The Th2 shift manifests itself in a decrease of cellular immunity and increase in humoral immunity (antibody production) shifts it from cellular to humoral by downregulating cell-mediated immunity and enhancing Th2 immune response by stimulating IL-4 production and Th2 differentiation. Type 1 and type 17 immune responses are downregulated, likely to be at least partially due to IL-4, which inhibits Th1. Effect of estrogen on different immune cells´ cell types is in line with its Th2 bias. Activity of basophils, eosinophils, M2 macrophages and is enhanced, whereas activity of NK cells is downregulated. Conventional dendritic cells are biased towards Th2 under the influence of estrogen, whereas plasmacytoid dendritic cells, key players in antiviral defence, have increased IFN-g secretion. Estrogen also influences B cells by increasing their survival, proliferation, differentiation and function, which corresponds with higher antibody and B cell count generally detected in women.

On a molecular level estrogen induces the above mentioned effects on cell via acting on intracellular receptors termed ER α and ER β, which upon ligation form either homo or heterodimers. The genetic and nongenetic targets of the receptors differ between homo and heterodimers. Ligation of these receptors allows them to translocate to the nucleus and act as transcription factors either by binding estrogen response elements (ERE) on DNA or binding DNA together with other transcriptional factors e.g. Nf-kB or AP-1, both of which result in RNA polymerase recruitment and further chromatin remodelation. A non-transcriptional response to oestrogen stimulation was also documented (termed membrane-initiated steroid signalling, MISS). This pathway stimulates the ERK and PI3K/AKT pathways, which are known to increase cellular proliferation and affect chromatin remodelation.

Associated conditions
Researchers have implicated estrogens in various estrogen-dependent conditions, such as ER-positive breast cancer, as well as a number of genetic conditions involving estrogen signaling or metabolism, such as estrogen insensitivity syndrome, aromatase deficiency, and aromatase excess syndrome.

High estrogen can amplify stress-hormone responses in stressful situations.

Biochemistry

Biosynthesis

Estrogens, in females, are produced primarily by the ovaries, and during pregnancy, the placenta. Follicle-stimulating hormone (FSH) stimulates the ovarian production of estrogens by the granulosa cells of the ovarian follicles and corpora lutea. Some estrogens are also produced in smaller amounts by other tissues such as the liver, pancreas, bone, adrenal glands, skin, brain, adipose tissue, and the breasts. These secondary sources of estrogens are especially important in postmenopausal women.
The pathway of estrogen biosynthesis in extragonadal tissues is different. These tissues are not able to synthesize C19 steroids, and therefore depend on C19 supplies from other tissues and the level of aromatase.

In females, synthesis of estrogens starts in theca interna cells in the ovary, by the synthesis of androstenedione from cholesterol. Androstenedione is a substance of weak androgenic activity which serves predominantly as a precursor for more potent androgens such as testosterone as well as estrogen. This compound crosses the basal membrane into the surrounding granulosa cells, where it is converted either immediately into estrone, or into testosterone and then estradiol in an additional step. The conversion of androstenedione to testosterone is catalyzed by 17β-hydroxysteroid dehydrogenase (17β-HSD), whereas the conversion of androstenedione and testosterone into estrone and estradiol, respectively is catalyzed by aromatase, enzymes which are both expressed in granulosa cells. In contrast, granulosa cells lack 17α-hydroxylase and 17,20-lyase, whereas theca cells express these enzymes and 17β-HSD but lack aromatase. Hence, both granulosa and theca cells are essential for the production of estrogen in the ovaries.

Estrogen levels vary through the menstrual cycle, with levels highest near the end of the follicular phase just before ovulation.

Note that in males, estrogen is also produced by the Sertoli cells when FSH binds to their FSH receptors.

Distribution
Estrogens are plasma protein bound to albumin and/or sex hormone-binding globulin in the circulation.

Metabolism

Estrogens are metabolized via hydroxylation by cytochrome P450 enzymes such as CYP1A1 and CYP3A4 and via conjugation by estrogen sulfotransferases (sulfation) and UDP-glucuronyltransferases (glucuronidation). In addition, estradiol is dehydrogenated by 17β-hydroxysteroid dehydrogenase into the much less potent estrogen estrone. These reactions occur primarily in the liver, but also in other tissues.

Excretion
Estrogens are excreted primarily by the kidneys as conjugates via the urine.

Medical use

Estrogens are used as medications, mainly in hormonal contraception, hormone replacement therapy, and to treat gender dysphoria in transgender women and other transfeminine individuals as part of feminizing hormone therapy.

Chemistry

The estrogen steroid hormones are estrane steroids.

History

In 1929, Adolf Butenandt and Edward Adelbert Doisy independently isolated and purified estrone, the first estrogen to be discovered. Then, estriol and estradiol were discovered in 1930 and 1933, respectively. Shortly following their discovery, estrogens, both natural and synthetic, were introduced for medical use. Examples include estriol glucuronide (Emmenin, Progynon), estradiol benzoate, conjugated estrogens (Premarin), diethylstilbestrol, and ethinylestradiol.

The word estrogen derives from Ancient Greek. It is derived from "oestros" (a periodic state of sexual activity in female mammals), and genos (generating). It was first published in the early 1920s and referenced as "oestrin". With the years, American English adapted the spelling of estrogen to fit with its phonetic pronunciation. Nevertheless, both estrogen and oestrogen are used nowadays, yet some still wish to maintain its original spelling as it reflects the origin of the word.

Society and culture

Etymology
The name estrogen is derived from the Greek , literally meaning "verve" or "inspiration" but figuratively sexual passion or desire, and the suffix -gen, meaning "producer of".

Environment
A range of synthetic and natural substances that possess estrogenic activity have been identified in the environment and are referred to xenoestrogens.
 Synthetic substances such as bisphenol A as well as metalloestrogens (e.g., cadmium).
 Plant products with estrogenic activity are called phytoestrogens (e.g., coumestrol, daidzein, genistein, miroestrol).
 Those produced by fungi are known as mycoestrogens (e.g., zearalenone).

Estrogens are among the wide range of endocrine-disrupting compounds (EDCs) because they have high estrogenic potency. When an EDC makes its way into the environment, it may cause male reproductive dysfunction to wildlife and humans. The estrogen excreted from farm animals makes its way into fresh water systems. During the germination period of reproduction the fish are exposed to low levels of estrogen which may cause reproductive dysfunction to male fish.

Cosmetics
Some hair shampoos on the market include estrogens and placental extracts; others contain phytoestrogens. In 1998, there were case reports of four prepubescent African-American girls developing breasts after exposure to these shampoos. In 1993, the FDA determined that not all over-the-counter topically applied hormone-containing drug products for human use are generally recognized as safe and effective and are misbranded. An accompanying proposed rule deals with cosmetics, concluding that any use of natural estrogens in a cosmetic product makes the product an unapproved new drug and that any cosmetic using the term "hormone" in the text of its labeling or in its ingredient statement makes an implied drug claim, subjecting such a product to regulatory action.

In addition to being considered misbranded drugs, products claiming to contain placental extract may also be deemed to be misbranded cosmetics if the extract has been prepared from placentas from which the hormones and other biologically active substances have been removed and the extracted substance consists principally of protein. The FDA recommends that this substance be identified by a name other than "placental extract" and describing its composition more accurately because consumers associate the name "placental extract" with a therapeutic use of some biological activity.

See also 
 List of steroid abbreviations
 Breastfeeding and fertility

References

External links 
 Nussey and Whitehead: Endocrinology, an integrated approach, Taylor and Francis 2001. Free online textbook.

Phenols
Cyclopentanols
Antigonadotropins
Estranes
 
Fertility
Hepatotoxins
Hormones of the hypothalamus-pituitary-gonad axis
Hormones of the hypothalamic-pituitary-prolactin axis
Hormones of the ovary
Hormones of the pregnant female
Hormones of the testis
Human female endocrine system
Human hormones
Mammal female reproductive system
Prolactin releasers
Sex hormones
1929 in science
1929 in Germany
Sterols
Puberty